Adrothrips is a genus of thrips in the family Phlaeothripidae.

Species
 Adrothrips akanthus
 Adrothrips aureus
 Adrothrips cotteri
 Adrothrips intermedius
 Adrothrips systenus

References

Phlaeothripidae
Thrips
Thrips genera